Philip Morton may refer to:
 Philip Morton (cricketer), English cricketer and schoolmaster
 Philip Morton (politician), Australian politician
 Phil Morton, American video artist and activist
 Pat Morton (Philip Henry Morton), Australian businessman and politician